Mutant X is a science fiction television series that debuted on October 6, 2001. The show was created by Marvel Studios, and it centers on Mutant X, a team of "New Mutants" who possess extraordinary powers as a result of genetic engineering. Although it was said that a fourth season would be produced, it was canceled in 2004 after the dismantling of Fireworks Entertainment, one of the show's production companies, ending the show with an unsolved cliffhanger.

Mutant X follows the classic "Villain of the week" pattern. In nearly every episode a New Mutant appears which is later never seen of or heard from again. A continuing story arc appears only two times: the story arc revolving around Gabriel Ashlocke, which spans the final episode of the first season and the first several episodes of the second season and the second story arc revolving around The Dominion, a secret society, in the second half of the third season.

Series overview

Episodes

Season 1 (2001–02)
The first season starts off with a two-part episode that introduces the main characters. Afterward, the episodes become stand-alone episodes. In nearly every episode a New Mutant appears, whom Mutant X wants to help, while Genomex wants to capture this New Mutant. This work is often done by a special member of Genomex (who most times is also a New Mutant), who nearly always fails at the end of the episode and then vanishes to be never seen again. Although "Dancing on the Razor" aired after "A Breed Apart", the latter episode is the season finale episode.

Season 2 (2002–03)
As shown at the end of season one, Genomex is defeated while Mason Eckhart is put into a stasis capsule. The main villain is now Gabriel Ashlocke, a powerful New Mutant who however suffers from the fatal side effects of his mutations. Most of the first episodes of season two revolve around Ashlocke and his plans to cure himself from his deadly mutations. After he is killed, the next episodes are again stand-alone episodes which follows "The New Mutant of the Week" pattern.

Season 3 (2003–04)
Season three sees several major cast changes. In the beginning of the first episode it is revealed that Emma is dead while Adam is also presumed dead (which later turns out to be false). A new fourth New Mutant, Lexa Pierce, joins Mutant X. Mutant X now works for the secret society known as The Dominion, which forces them in most episodes to solve problems revolving around New Mutants or other genetic problems.

References

External links
 

Lists of American science fiction television series episodes
Lists of Canadian television series episodes
Lists of Marvel Comics television series episodes
X-Men television series episodes